Yam Kaspers Anshel (born February 15, 1998) is an Israeli beauty pageant titleholder who became first runner-up in Miss Israel 2016.
She represented Israel at the Miss Universe 2016 pageant.

Personal life 
Yam was born in 1998 in Herzliya, Israel. Yam grew up living on board a boat in the Herzliya marina. She was labeled an academically gifted child, and at age 14 she became a youth horse-riding champion in Israel.

Pageantry 
On June 6, 2016 Yam Kaspers Anshel came in second-place in Miss Israel 2016 competition, after Karin Alia. As a result, she competed in Miss Universe 2016.

Yam Kaspers Anshel competed at Miss Universe 2016 but did not place.

References 

1998 births
Israeli beauty pageant winners
Israeli female models
Israeli Jews
Jewish female models
Living people
Miss Universe 2016 contestants
Miss Israel delegates